Rosa arabica is a species of rose in the plant family of the Rosaceae, endemic to the Mount Catherine region in the south of the Sinai in Egypt. The species is considered critically endangered.

References

arabica
Taxa named by François Crépin
Taxa named by Pierre Edmond Boissier
Taxa named by Pierre Alfred Déséglise